Sergey Ivanovich Morozov (born 6 September 1959, Ulyanovsk) is a Russian politician who is currently a member of parliament of the State Duma. He had served as the 3rd governor of Ulyanovsk Oblast in Russia from 6 January 2005 until 8 April 2021. He was elected in 2004; his term started in 2005.

After completing military service in the Soviet Pacific Fleet in 1980 he graduated from the All Union Juristic Institute in 1981. Between 1981 and 2000 he worked for the Ministry of the Interior in the Ulyanovsk Oblast later becoming head of the local Drug Enforcement Department.  Morozov was elected mayor of Dimitrovgrad in 2000 and then governor of Ulyanovsk in 2004. He is married and has two sons and a daughter.

Morozov took a special interest in promoting the cultural events surrounding the 2016 Bandy World Championship, which took place in Ulyanovsk.

He is one of the members of the State Duma the United States Treasury sanctioned on 24 March 2022 in response to the 2022 Russian invasion of Ukraine.

References

1959 births
Living people
Governors of Ulyanovsk Oblast
21st-century Russian politicians
United Russia politicians
People from Ulyanovsk
Eighth convocation members of the State Duma (Russian Federation)
Kutafin Moscow State Law University alumni
Russian individuals subject to the U.S. Department of the Treasury sanctions